The 2005 Pocono 500 was the 14th stock car race of the 2005 NASCAR Nextel Cup Series and the 24th iteration of the event. The race was held on Sunday, June 12, 2005 at Pocono Raceway in Long Pond, Pennsylvania, a  triangular track that holds NASCAR races to this day. The race was held before a crowd of 100,000. Rookie Carl Edwards would win the race under caution, his second of the season and his career after originally starting 29th, proceeding to lead 46 laps. Brian Vickers and Joe Nemechek would take the rest of the podium positions, taking 2nd and 3rd, respectively.

Background

Qualifying

Race 
For pre-race ceremonies, the invocation was given out by Father Dan Bisco. The national anthem would be performed by the United States Army Chorus.

Race results

References 

2005 NASCAR Nextel Cup Series
NASCAR races at Pocono Raceway
2005 in sports in Pennsylvania
June 2005 sports events in the United States